Bill Luckwell (1913–1967) was a British film producer and screenwriter. He founded Bill Luckwell Productions to make supporting features.

Selected filmography
Producer
 Miss Tulip Stays the Night (1955)
 See How They Run (1955)
 Not So Dusty (1956)
 West of Suez (1957)
 The Crooked Sky (1957)
 Undercover Girl (1958)
 The Hand (1960)
 Murder in Eden (1961)
 Ambush in Leopard Street (1962)

References

Bibliography
 Chibnall, Steve & McFarlane, Brian. The British 'B' Film. Palgrave MacMillan, 2011.

External links

1913 births
1967 deaths
British film producers
British male screenwriters
People from Badminton, Gloucestershire
20th-century British screenwriters
20th-century British businesspeople